JJ Collins né Felise (born 15 February 1996) is an Australian professional rugby league footballer who plays as a  for the Dolphins in the NRL. 

He previously played for the Wests Tigers and the Newcastle Knights in the National Rugby League and the Tweed Heads Seagulls in the Queensland Cup.

Background
Collins was born in Logan City, Queensland, Australia. He is of Samoan descent. Collins was formerly known as Jacob Junior Felise, later JJ Felise, before changing his name to JJ Collins.

He played his junior rugby league for the Logan Brothers and attended Keebra Park State High School, before signing with the Wests Tigers as a teenager.

Playing career

Early career
While attending Keebra Park, Collins was a member of their 2013 ARL Schoolboy Cup winning side and represented the Queensland Schoolboys in 2013 and 2014. In 2015 and 2016, he played for the Wests Tigers' NYC team, playing in 21 games in 2015.

2016
In January 2016, Collins was named in the Queensland Academy of Sport under-20s squad. In round 7 of the 2016 NRL season, he made his NRL debut for the Tigers against the Melbourne Storm. Coach Jason Taylor said his debut was, "was a tough game that went into extra time and he just didn’t look out of place for a second, which when you stop and think about it, is an incredible thing for a prop on debut against that pack." On 1 June, he re-signed with the Tigers on a 2-year contract until the end of 2018. He played in 8 games for the season, all from the interchange bench.

2017
Suffering some recurring injuries and a lengthy stint in reserve grade, Collins only made five NRL appearances for the season.

2018
Ahead of round 16 of the 2018 season, Collins joined the Newcastle Knights effective immediately after not being able to break into the Tigers' NRL side all season. After spending some time in the Newcastle reserve grade side, he made his club debut in round 21 against his former team the Wests Tigers. He went on to play one more NRL match for the Newcastle outfit, before parting ways at the end of the season.

2019
Ahead of the 2019 NRL season, Collins joined the Canberra Raiders on a two-year contract.
Collins made his debut for Canberra in round 6 of the 2019 NRL season against the Brisbane Broncos which ended in a 26-22 victory at Canberra Stadium.

2022
On 10 May, Collins signed a contract to join the newly admitted Dolphins side ahead of the 2023 NRL season.

References

External links

Canberra Raiders profile
Newcastle Knights profile
Wests Tigers profile
NRL profile

1996 births
Living people
Australian sportspeople of Samoan descent
Australian rugby league players
Canberra Raiders players
Newcastle Knights players
People educated at Keebra Park State High School
Rugby league players from Logan, Queensland
Rugby league props
Western Suburbs Magpies NSW Cup players
Wests Tigers NSW Cup players
Wests Tigers players